Bulat Kerimzhanovich Darbekov (born October 21, 1957) is a Kazakh military general and former head of the Collective Security Treaty Organization. He served CSTO joint chief from June 2004 to June 2005 and chairman of the Committee of Chiefs of Staff, in addition to first deputy minister in the ministry of Defence, and deputy commander of the National Guard.

Biography 
Darbekov was born in Tokmak, Kirghiz Soviet Socialist Republic. He obtained his graduation with honors from the Alma-Ata Higher All-Arms Command School in 1979. Before his appointment as commander of airborne assault platoon, the 35th Guards Air Assault Brigade in November 1979, he took his first assignment as a commander of a motorized rifle platoon of the Group of Soviet Forces in Germany.

Between November 1995 to May 1998, he served at various units, including commander of a motorized rifle regiment, military unit #23260 officer, and instructor of the tactics department of the Alma-Ata Higher All-Arms Command School and tactics department of the Military Academy of the Armed Forces of the Republic of Kazakhstan. In May 1998 he was assigned at a tank division of an army corps as a deputy commander.

After he obtained his graduation with honors from the General Staff of the Armed Forces of the Russian Federation in 2001, he  was appointed deputy chief of the General Staff of the Armed Forces of the Republic of Kazakhstan for the Operational Planning department.

Before retiring from the armed forces, he served commander of the Regional Command for Southern command from April 2007 to November 2008.

References 

Living people
1957 births
Kazakhstani generals
Chiefs of the General Staff (Kazakhstan)
Military Academy of the General Staff of the Armed Forces of the Soviet Union alumni